

Events
 1 January – Mildura Digital Television, a joint venture between WIN Television Mildura and Prime Television, goes on air in the Mildura area of Victoria as a Network Ten digital-only affiliate.
 2 January – The Seven, Foxtel and Ten Networks outbid Channel Nine and are awarded the rights to broadcast the AFL from 2007 to 2011 for a record $780 million. Also around this time, Seven announce that they have won the rights to broadcast the V8 Supercars from 2007 to 2014.
 30 January – Channel Nine launches a new logo and major revamp, dropping the famous dots and replacing it with a stand-alone nine in a blue box.
 9 February – The Nine Network announces Eddie McGuire in his new role as the network's new CEO.
 20 February – Television Sydney formally launches after three months of testing, giving Sydney community television for the first time in almost two years.
 1 April – The final season of Blue Heelers goes to air now on Saturday Nights, pitting it against ABC's The Bill and Network Ten's AFL coverage.
 3 April – After weeks of poor ratings Who Wants to Be a Millionaire? airs for the final time on Monday Nights. It returns for a short period following an 18-month break due to McGuire's role as CEO for the Nine Network.
 9 May – Then Sunrise weather presenter and future Family Feud host Grant Denyer and his partner Amanda Garner win the fourth season of Dancing with the Stars.
 21 May – Brant Webb and Todd Russell speak to new A Current Affair host Tracy Grimshaw about their time underground in Beaconsfield in a 2-hour special called The Great Escape. They are paid a reported $2.6 million by Channel Nine for the right to talk to them.
 4 June – After 12 years and a record-breaking 510 episodes, the last episode of the Seven Network show Blue Heelers goes to air.
 30 June – Australian soap opera Neighbours Broadcasts its 5000th episode, which sees Paul Robinson trapped in a mineshaft by his son Robert.
 7 July – Children's fantasy drama series H2O: Just Add Water starring Claire Holt, Phoebe Tonkin and Cariba Heine premieres on Network Ten.
 9 July – BBC Nature Documentary series Planet Earth narrated by David Attenborough premieres on the ABC.
 18 July – Australian kids program Play School celebrates 40 years on air.
 31 July – Jamie Brooksby wins the sixth season of Big Brother.
 29 August – Model Jake Wall and his professional skating partner Maria Filippov win the first season of Torvill and Dean's Dancing on Ice.
 14 September – Today Tonight host Naomi Robson is deported from Indonesia after doing a story on a West Papuan boy called Wa Wa who, supposedly, was going to be eaten by cannibals. This sparks a war of words between Seven and Nine, who ran the original story on Wa Wa in May on 60 Minutes. Naomi presents her final edition of Today Tonight on 1 December.
 16 September – Television in Australia turns 50. The next day, this is commemorated with a live TV special from Star City, Sydney on the Seven Network.
 29 September Backyard Blitz finishes its 6-year run on the Nine Network. Jamie Durie leaves Nine and signs up with the Seven Network, the next year, he dances his way on Dancing with the Stars.
 30 September – The Fox Footy Channel ceases broadcasting then later revived as Fox Footy in 2012. It is replaced by Fox Sports 3 and Fox Sports News on 1 October.
 18 October – PBL announces the sale of 50% of the Nine Network, including its 50% stake in ninemsn and ACP to CVC Asia Pacific for $4.5 billion.
 26 November – Irishman Damien Leith defeats 17-year-old Jessica Mauboy to be based only on Sony BMG after being crowned the title of Australian Idol 2006 at the Sydney Opera House.
 28 November – AFL player Anthony Koutoufides (Kouta) and his partner Natalie Lowe win the fifth season of Dancing with the Stars.
 10 December – Network Ten and Fox Sports broadcasts V8 Supercars for the final-ever time, before handing the television rights to the Seven Network from 2007 to 2014. Ten and Fox Sports later revived the V8 Supercars coverage 9 years later.
 Voiceover artist Robbie McGregor leaves SBS after 17 years. He is replaced the next year by Lani John Tupu.

Ratings

New channels
 1 October – Fox Sports 3
 1 October – Fox Sports News
 15 November – Al Jazeera English
 1 December – Sci Fi Channel

Premieres

Free-to-air television

Subscription television

New international programming

Subscription television

Programming changes

Changes to network affiliation
This is a list of programs which made their premiere on an Australian television network that had previously premiered on another Australian television network. The networks involved in the switch of allegiances are predominantly both free-to-air networks or both subscription television networks. Programs that have their free-to-air/subscription television premiere, after previously premiering on the opposite platform (free-to air to subscription/subscription to free-to air) are not included. In some cases, programs may still air on the original television network. This occurs predominantly with programs shared between subscription television networks.

Subscription premieres
This is a list of programs which made their premiere on Australian subscription television that had previously premiered on Australian free-to-air television. Programs may still air on the original free-to-air television network.

International

Television shows

1950s

1960s
 Four Corners (1961–present)

1970s

1980s
 Wheel of Fortune (1981–1996, 1996–2003, 2004 –2006)
 Neighbours (1985–present)
 Home and Away (1988–present)
 The Movie Show (1986–2008)
 Rage (1987–present)

1990s
 Hotline (1990–2007)
 Australia's Funniest Home Videos (1990–present)

2000s
2001
 Big Brother (2001–2008, 2012–2014)

2002

2003
 Australian Idol (2003–2009)
 Deal or No Deal (2003–2013)

2004
 Border Security: Australia's Front Line (2004–present)
 Dancing with the Stars (2004–present)

2005
 Medical Emergency (2005–present)

Ending this year

TV movies

See also
 2006 in Australia
 List of Australian films of 2006

References